Indigenous is a 2014 American horror film directed by Alastair Orr and written by Max Roberts. It stars Zachary Soetenga, Lindsey McKeon, Sofia Pernas, Pierson Fodé, Jamie Anderson, Juanxo Villaverde and Layla Killino.

Plot 
Five friends, Scott (Zachary Soetenga) and his girlfriend Steph (Lindsey McKeon), Elena (Sofia Pernas), Trevor (Pierson Fodé) and Charlie (Jamie Anderson) meet in Panama for vacation. While partying at night, Trevor meets the natives Carmen (Layla Killino) and Julio (Juanxo Villaverd). Scott becomes interested in exploring the Darién Gap, despite a number of people believing that a group of teenagers were murdered by El Chupacabra in the area, including Julio who warns the group away from going. However, Carmen tells the group of a beautiful waterfall deep in the jungle and convinces them to hike there.

The following morning, Julio realizes that Carmen has taken the group into the jungle despite his warnings, and sets off to find them. Meanwhile, the group hike far into the jungle to reach the waterfall. After some time, Trevor and Carmen leave the rest of the group to be alone, but begin to hear strange noises in the jungle. While Trevor is investigating, Carmen disappears. They attempt phoning her, but find her phone smashed nearby, before losing service, leaving them stranded in the jungle. As night falls, the group realize that they are being stalked. After catching a glimpse of a wild animal, the group scatter through the jungle in terror, and Charlie is attacked and killed. Elena and Trevor discover the body and run into Scott and Steph. Scott decides to try and reach higher ground in order to get cell-phone service. After leaving the others, Scott records a distress video, hoping it will reach someone who can help. However, he is interrupted by the others screaming and rushes back, only to find a bloodied Trevor, who is quickly dragged away. Scott follows him into a cave where he finds El Chupacabra's lair, then flees and catches up with Steph and Elena.

Trevor awakens in the cave with a broken leg and finds Carmen's mauled body. He attempts to escape from the cave, but is attacked and killed. The following day, Scott's video has been posted on social media and has gone viral, prompting a search and rescue mission by Panama authorities, accompanied by Julio. Having survived the night, Scott, Steph and Elena are once again attacked by El Chupacabra. While running through the jungle, Steph breaks her ankle. Scott stays with Steph while Elena leaves to flag down the attention of an overhead helicopter. However, as the helicopter crew is recording Elena she is attacked by El Chupacabra. Soon afterwards, Scott and Steph are also attacked, but military personnel arrive and shoot El Chupacabra, saving them.

Cast 
 Zachary Soetenga as Scott Williams
 Lindsey McKeon  as Steph Logan
 Sofia Pernas as Elena Cadero
 Pierson Fodé as Trevor
 Jamie Anderson as Charlie
 Juanxo Villaverde as Julio
 Layla Killino as Carmen
 Michael Mealor as Marlon Williams

Production 
Indigenous was shot on location in Panama. Director Orr credited his cast and crew with making the film possible, as they had to carry all of the equipment themselves through the jungle.

Release 
Indigenous premiered at the 2014 Tribeca Film Festival. It later played at the 2014 Cannes Film Festival.

Reception 

Mark Adams of Screen Daily wrote that it is "modestly entertaining" and "a well-made B-Movie" despite the familiar plot and one-note acting.

References

External links 
 
 

2014 films
2014 horror films
2010s monster movies
American independent films
American monster movies
American survival films
Films set in Panama
Films set in jungles
Films shot in Panama
Films about cryptids
2010s English-language films
2010s American films